String theory is a branch of theoretical physics.

String theory may also refer to:

 Concatenation theory, a topic in symbolic logic dealing with strings of characters

Music
 String Theory (band), an American electronic music band
 String Theory (Hanson album), 2018
 String Theory (The Selecter album), 2013

Other media
 "String Theory" (Heroes), retitled "Five Years Gone", an episode of the TV series Heroes
 "String Theory" (The Shield), an episode of the TV series The Shield
 String Theory (novels), a trilogy of Star Trek: Voyager novels
 String Theory, a webcomic graphic novel based on the TV series Heroes
 String Theory (artist collective), based in Gothenburg, Sweden, and Berlin, Germany

See also 
 String theory landscape, the large number of possible false vacua in string theory
 Knot theory, a branch of mathematical topology